Saifun may refer to:

 Saifun Semiconductors, Ltd., an Israel-based semiconductor firm acquired by Spansion
 Saifun, the Taishanese pronunciation for cellophane noodles